Euxoa cos is a moth of the family Noctuidae. It is found in southern Europe, the Near East and Middle East.

Adults are on wing in September to October. There is one generation per year.

The larvae feed partly subterraneous on various herbaceous plants.

Subspecies
Euxoa cos cos
Euxoa cos crimaea

References

External links
 Noctuinae of Israel

Euxoa
Moths of Europe
Moths of Asia
Moths of the Middle East
Moths described in 1824